Hickory golf is a variation of golf played with hickory-shafted golf clubs. In the United States the main organizing bodies are The Society of Hickory Golfers (SoHG) and the Golf Collectors Society; in Canada - The Canadian Golf Historical Society; in the UK - The British Golf Collectors Society; and leading on the continent, in Poland - Polish Hickory Golf Society and Hickory World. 
There are also quite active groups in Switzerland, Austria, Germany, Italy, Croatia, Sweden and Finland that conduct national tournaments.

Part of the attraction of playing with hickory clubs is that they reintroduce 'feel' to the golf shot. Proponents also claim that hickory golf allows golfers to play classic golf courses as they are meant to be played.

Divisions
There are two main divisions of play, pre-1935 and pre-1900. 

The pre-1900 group play a gutta-percha style ball, and clubs are limited to those produced before 1900 or approved reproductions. Iron clubs are smooth-faced and woods are splice-necked. The main tournament for this group is the National Hickory Championship organized by Peter Georgiady. In June of 2019 it will conduct its 22nd Championship at the historic Mound Golf Course in Miamisburg, OH. The majority of the "NHC" tournaments have been conducted in White Sulphur Springs, West Virginia at Oakhurst Links, as restored by Lewis Keller, and identified by the National Register of Historic Places as the oldest golf course in the United States. The two other venues have been Pinehurst No.8 & No.1 (one Championship) and The St. Martin's course of The Philadelphia Cricket Club (two Championships).

The pre-1935 group (vintage division) play with modern balls, but play is limited to clubs manufactured before 1935 or to authorized reproductions. There are numerous tournaments and championships.

Championships
There are a number of Championships conducted in countries around the world. The majority of the events are currently held in the United States and the United Kingdom. Poland, Sweden, Switzerland, Germany, Australia, France and Finland have held events. Schedules of these events are available at Hickorygolf.com and the SoHG (hickorygolfers.com) and in Europe (HickoryWorld.org).

The French hickory golf Championship (francehickory.com) of La Société Française de Golf Hickory is one of the first tournament of Continental Europe and since 2009 involves Professional Golfers.
The inaugural Championship during Centennial of Chantilly G.C. was remarked by never seen scores under PAR. It is the first prize money Championship of Continental Europe.

The Swiss Hickory Championship Days (swisshickory.ch) were inaugurated in 2011. They are held on the oldest golf course in Switzerland, the Engadine Golf Club - Since 1893 in St. Moritz/Samedan. Amateurs and Professionals are welcomed to participate in this hickory event. 

The "Polish Hickory Open" is organised as international Championship, inaugurated at First Warsaw Golf &CC in 2011 and since then sponsored by "Hickory World" - an organisation promoting hickory golf in CE since 1998.
"The Hickory Open" Championship is organised as the tribute to best players of the hickory era, playing historical length of the Preswick Old Course 3799 yards over 12 holes with only the originals hickory golf clubs and the game is based on original 13 rules of golf.

The UK tournament - The World Hickory Open Championship (www.worldhickoryopen.com), which was inaugurated in 2004 and played on Musselburgh Old Course, the oldest still surviving playing surface in the world (Guinness Book of Records). This year (2010) the tournament continues as part of the Festival of Hickory Golf, played on some of Scotland's best known East Lothian golf courses including Musselburgh Old Course, Craigielaw, Gullane 2 and 3, and Archerfield. 

The Royal Musselburgh Golf Club host the Scottish Hickory Open Championship. At this event any player is eligible to participate as Hickory Clubs are available on the day which makes the event available to all golfers of all abilities.

References

External links

 The Society of Hickory Golfers
 The Golf Collectors Society
 The official website of Swiss Hickory Golfers
 Swiss Hickory Championship Days
 Official site of the National Hickory Championship
 Carolina Hickory Golf Association
  Northwest Hickory Players (USA)
  Plus Four Podcast on Hickory Golf
 Hickory Golf in UK 
 
Individual sports
Precision sports
Ball games
Forms of golf